Chillon refers to Chillon Castle on the homonymous island in Switzerland. In the vicinity are:

Fort de Chillon, a twentieth-century fortification adjacent to Chillon Castle
Viaduc de Chillon, a motorway viaduct overlooking Chillon Castle

Chillon may also refer to:

Chillón, a municipality in Spain
Chillón River, a river in Peru
Alberto Chillon, an Italian rugby union player